The Iloilo Golf and Country Club, formerly and informally known as the Santa Barbara Golf Course in Brgy. San Sebastian, Santa Barbara, Iloilo on  35 hectares of plain and rolling hills. It is considered the oldest golf course in Southeast Asia.

It was built in 1907 by a group of Irish expatriates building the Panay line of Panay Railways, also completed in 1907. It was opened to the public in 1913. The original course was a crude 9-hole course.  A club followed the establishment of the course, which was initially only open to expats but by 1920 Filipinos were allowed to join including Tomas Confesor and Eugenio Lopez, Sr. and brother  Fernando.

Prior to 1947 the course was known as the Santa Barbara Golf and Country Club

References

Golf clubs and courses in the Philippines
Buildings and structures in Iloilo